Gerald Palmer may refer to:

 Gerald Palmer (car designer) (1911–1999), designer of the Jowett Javelin
 Gerald Palmer (author) (1904–1984), author, English-language translator  and British Conservative politician
 Gerald Palmer (comics), comics artist whose work includes Dan Dare